Dalia Cristina Fernández Sánchez (born January 3, 1990 in Santiago de los Caballeros) is a Dominican beauty pageant titleholder who was crowned Miss Dominican Republic 2011 and represented the country in the 2011 Miss Universe pageant.

In 2012 she was elected by Luz García’s Noche de Luz programme as a "Summer’s Hot Body".

Early life
Prior to her participation in Miss Dominican Republic 2011, Fernández competed in Reina Mundial del Banano 2009 in Machala, Ecuador on September 23, 2009. As the eventual first runner-up of the event, she won a crown made of 500 green pearls, tourmaline gem stones, and 700 crystals in silver finish. Fernández is currently pursuing a bachelor's degree in psychology.

Miss Dominican Republic 2011

Fernández competed as the representative of Santiago, one of 36 finalists in her country's national beauty pageant, Miss Dominican Republic 2011, broadcast live from Santo Domingo on March 8, 2011, where she became the eventual winner of the title, gaining the right to represent the Dominican Republic in Miss Universe 2011.

Miss Universe 2011
Fernández represented the Dominican Republic to the Miss Universe 2011]] pageant, broadcast live from São Paulo, Brazil on September 12, 2011,  where she competed to succeed the outgoing titleholder, Ximena Navarrete of Mexico but failed to place in the semifinals.

References

External links
Official Miss Dominican Republic website

1990 births
Living people
People from Santiago de los Caballeros
Miss Dominican Republic
Miss Universe 2011 contestants